The Dasan Machineries K16 is a 5.56×45mm NATO selective fire assault rifle based on DSAR15PC, which is a modified CQB variant of DSAR15P designed and manufactured by Dasan Machineries.

History
The Republic of Korea Armed Forces classifies K16 as submachine gun for same reason as K1A while its general characteristic is closer to assault rifle or carbine. K16 will undergo 3 years of development and 1 year of feasibility study in between 2020 and 2024, and start mass-producing by 2024.

The DSAR-15PC was selected on June 23, 2020 to replace K1A carbine in service in the Republic of Korea Army Special Warfare Command after competing against S&T Motiv STC-16. According to an unnamed South Korean military official, special forces personnel from the 707th Special Mission Group and the 13th Special Mission Brigade will receive 1,000 DSAR-15PCs. 15,000 DSAR-15PCs with modifications based on feedback will be delivered by 2023.

However the DSAR-15PC was cancelled as the base model for the special operational submachine gun development project due to allegations of leaking military secrets by a former manufacturer's executive. As a result, the project returned to square one, forcing the selection of other firearms.

Variants

 DSAR-15: 5.56×45mm NATO short-stroke piston AR-15 type assault rifle derived from HK416 and CAR 816 designed by Dasan Machineries.
 DSAR-15P: Modified DSAR15. 3 different barrel length available: 11.5 in (CBQ), 14.5 in (carbine), and 16 in (rifle).
 DSAR-15PC: Modified DSAR15P CQB. Selected by the ROK Armed Forces as the base model for the special operational submachine gun development project to replace the K1A. But the project was cancelled in June 2021.

Users

 : The Special Response Team of the Indonesian Maritime Security Agency used DSAR15P variant.
 : 1,000 DSAR-15PC to be fielded to the 707th Special Mission Group and the 13th Special Mission Brigade of the ROKASWC prior to mass production stage to gain feedbacks. First batch of 16,300 K16 will be produced in 2024. However, the proposed acquisition was cancelled in June 2021.

See also
 AR-15
 Heckler & Koch HK416
 CAR 816
 Daewoo Precision Industries K1

References

5.56×45mm NATO assault rifles
Carbines
Post–Cold War weapons of South Korea